Kathleen Teresa Martínez Berry (born 1966) is a Dominican lawyer, archaeologist, and diplomat, best known for her work since 2005 in the search for the tomb of Cleopatra in the Taposiris Magna temple in Egypt. She heads the Egyptian-Dominican mission in Alexandria, and is currently minister counselor in charge of cultural affairs at the Dominican embassy in Egypt.

Early life
Kathleen Martínez was born in Santo Domingo in 1966. Her father, professor and legal scholar Fausto Martínez, owned an extensive private library, which she drew on to research the subject which would become her great passion – Egypt and the last days of Cleopatra. Her mother is of Franco-English descent.

Studies
Despite her childhood passion for Egypt, Martínez focused her early studies on a legal career. "My parents had convinced me that it was not worthwhile for me to be an archaeologist because I would never have a serious job and could not make a living from that profession. They convinced me," she explained in some of her interviews. Like her father, she studied law, attending the Universidad Nacional Pedro Henríquez Ureña, as well as going to study English at Brown University in the United States. She graduated at 19, and began working as a lawyer. She also holds master's degrees in finance and archaeology.

Investigating the person Cleopatra
Her obsession with Cleopatra – she has explained repeatedly in the press – was born out of an argument with her father in 1990, and a group of friends who considered that her biography was not very significant. Studying the history of Cleopatra, regardless of Roman propaganda and centuries of prejudice against women – Martínez asserts – allowed her to discover a woman ahead of her time, who studied at the university, who had to suffer the denigration of the Romans. "She knew medicine, laws; she was a philosopher, a poet," Martínez explains. After advancing in her research, she discovered the difference between oriental texts and ones written by the Romans. She studied – she explains – the canonical texts in detail, in particular Plutarch's account of Mark Antony's alliance with Cleopatra. She also found that modern researchers had quite possibly missed important clues about where she was buried.

In search of the tomb
Her initial hypothesis was that since Cleopatra was considered the representation of Isis, if she had had to search for a place to be buried in her last days, she would have chosen a temple dedicated to the goddess. From Strabo's descriptions of ancient Egypt, Martínez sketched a map of potential burial sites and identified 21 localities associated with the legend of Isis and Osiris. After ruling out some temples, she located one on the outskirts of Alexandria that met all her criteria to be the one that sheltered the tomb: the temple of Taposiris Magna (the great house of Osiris). This was at odds with another hypothesis, developed by French explorer Franck Goddio and the European Institute of Underwater Archaeology, seeking the tomb in a palace of Alexandria which had been buried underwater by an earthquake, whose excavations were resumed in 1992.

Martínez made her first trip to Egypt in 2002. She managed to contact Zahi Hawass, the archaeologist and director of the Supreme Council of Antiquities, and visit some temples. When she arrived at Taposiris Magna she understood, she explains, that it was the place she was looking for. She returned to her country, made the decision to upend her life, and prepared a project with the support of the Universidad Católica Santo Domingo to begin excavating. It was the first time that Egypt had granted a license to excavate to a country in Latin America. Kathleen Martínez herself financed the first expedition and many others. Work began in 2004. In 2005, she decided to leave her law practice to move to Egypt and dedicate herself to archaeology. 

Martinez returned to the Dominican Republic, met with the Dominican Republic Minister of Foreign Affairs, was appointed as the first Minister of Culture to Egypt, and was issued a diplomatic passport.

Excavations at Taposiris Magna
Taposiris Magna, a semi-destroyed temple located on the edge of Lake Mariout in Borg El Arab, about 50 kilometers west of Alexandria, was the site Martínez selected. It was not the first time it had been excavated; the first expedition had been sent by Napoleon. The Egyptian authorities considered it an unimportant, unfinished temple. The reality, Martínez asserts, is that it had been destroyed and forgotten in the sand.

The archaeological evidence includes two subterranean chambers within the temple's walls. Martínez claims this is a new and important contribution to archaeology. A hieroglyphic and Demotic stele has also been located, indicating that the temple was considered holy ground. In 2018, it was announced that more than 800 pieces had been located, plus a large cemetery with fifteen catacombs, 800 bodies, and 14 mummies all from the same period. During more than 100 years of excavations, busts and coins with the face of Cleopatra have also been found.

In 2011 the magazine National Geographic dedicated its cover story and a report to the project.

In 2021, Egyptian-Dominican researchers led by Kathleen Martinez have announced the discovery of 2,000-year-old ancient tombs with golden tongues dating to the Greek and Roman periods at Taposiris Magna. The team also unearthed gold leaf amulets in the form of tongues placed for speaking with the god Osiris in the afterlife. The mummies were depicted in different forms: one of them was wearing a crown, decorated with horns, and the cobra snake at the forehead and the other was depicted with gilded decorations representing the wide necklace.

Use of technology for research
In 2008, ground-penetrating radar (GPR) was used to facilitate the search. It detected a network of tunnels and underground corridors at depths of 20.7 m, and three structures that could be burial chambers.

In 2016, this was supplemented by a GPR surveyor using more powerful radar to detect new chambers and follow the extent of the tunnels already discovered, potentially speeding up excavation work.

In January 2019, controversy arose over the possibility that the discovery of the tombs was imminent, attributed to remarks by Zahi Hawass at a conference at the University of Palermo. Hawass denied the news in an article in the newspaper Al-Ahram, affirming that the thesis that the tombs were in Taposiris Magna was not his but that of Kathleen Martínez, and that he did not believe Martínez's hypothesis because "the Egyptians never buried inside a temple", given that "the temples were for worshiping, and this was for the goddess Isis. It is therefore unlikely that Cleopatra was buried there."

Exhibition at the Cairo Museum
On 18 April 2018, the Cairo Museum inaugurated the exhibition "10 Years of Dominican Archaeology in Egypt", where the advances, achievements, and more than 350 architectural elements discovered by Martínez from the Ptolemaic dynasty were displayed. The artifacts are a record of daily life, administrative and religious activities, and royal and social roles that emerged at the end of the Ptolemaic period. The exhibition highlighted the first contribution of Latin America to the science of Egyptology.

The most significant piece is the so-called "great stele", with a decree from Pharaoh Ptolemy V revealing the date of the temple's construction to be between 221 and 203 BCE, and demonstrating, according to Martínez, the importance of said religious construction dedicated to the goddess Isis.

Awards and honours
  (2010)
 Cultural Personality of the Year Award (2011)
 Recognition of the Foreign Ministry of the Dominican Republic "for her substantial contributions to universal culture and for placing the Dominican Republic on the world map of the intellectual community" (December 2018)

References

1966 births
Dominican Republic archaeologists
20th-century Dominican Republic lawyers
Dominican Republic women lawyers
Dominican Republic women scientists
Living people
People from Santo Domingo
Universidad Nacional Pedro Henríquez Ureña alumni
Dominican Republic women archaeologists